Commercial Boulevard is a  highway serving northern Broward County, Florida, mostly designated as State Road 870 (SR 870). The road extends from its western terminus in Sunrise at SR 869, the Sawgrass Expressway, and serves as a major commercial route through Oakland Park, and Fort Lauderdale, intersecting Florida's Turnpike, U.S. Route 441 (US 441), Interstate 95 (I-95) and US 1 before reaching its eastern terminus at SR A1A (Ocean Boulevard) in Lauderdale-by-the-Sea, Florida.

The westernmost  of Commercial Boulevard are designated, but not signed, as County Road 870 (CR 870).

Route description
Commercial Boulevard begins at exit 5 of the Sawgrass Expressway, with SR 870 beginning at SR 817 (University Drive). The road heads east, with an interchange with the Turnpike, followed by an intersection with US 441.  Entering Fort Lauderdale, SR 870 intersects with Powerline Road, and then enters Oakland Park, passing by Fort Lauderdale Executive Airport, Lockhart Stadium, and Fort Lauderdale Stadium before an interchange with Interstate 95.  Continuing east, SR 870 intersects with State Road 811 before reentering Fort Lauderdale, intersecting with US 1.  It then enters Lauderdale-by-the-Sea and reaches its eastern terminus at an intersection with State Road A1A (Ocean Boulevard).

Major intersections

References

External links

870
870
870